Walsall Metropolitan Borough Council elections are held three years out of every four, with a third of the council elected each time. Walsall Metropolitan Borough Council, which styles itself "Walsall Council", is the local authority for the metropolitan district of Walsall in the West Midlands, England. Since the last boundary changes in 2004, 60 councillors have been elected from 20 wards.

Political control
From 1889 to 1974 Walsall was a county borough, independent of any county council. Under the Local Government Act 1972 it had its territory enlarged and became a metropolitan borough, with West Midlands County Council providing county-level services. The first election to the reconstituted borough council was held in 1973, initially operating as a shadow authority before coming into its revised powers on 1 April 1974. West Midlands County Council was abolished in 1986 and Walsall became a unitary authority. Political control of the council since 1974 has been held by the following parties:

Leadership
The leaders of the council since 2004 have been:

Council elections
1998 Walsall Metropolitan Borough Council election
1999 Walsall Metropolitan Borough Council election
2000 Walsall Metropolitan Borough Council election
2002 Walsall Metropolitan Borough Council election
2003 Walsall Metropolitan Borough Council election
2004 Walsall Metropolitan Borough Council election (whole council elected after boundary changes)
2006 Walsall Metropolitan Borough Council election
2007 Walsall Metropolitan Borough Council election
2008 Walsall Metropolitan Borough Council election
2010 Walsall Metropolitan Borough Council election
2011 Walsall Metropolitan Borough Council election
2012 Walsall Metropolitan Borough Council election
2014 Walsall Metropolitan Borough Council election
2015 Walsall Metropolitan Borough Council election
2016 Walsall Metropolitan Borough Council election
2018 Walsall Metropolitan Borough Council election
2019 Walsall Metropolitan Borough Council election
2021 Walsall Metropolitan Borough Council election
2022 Walsall Metropolitan Borough Council election

Borough result maps

By-election results

1997-2001

2001-2005

2005-2009

2009-2013

2013-2017

2021-

Cheema was unable to take her seat, due to being employed by Walsall Libraries at the time.

References

By-election results

External links
Walsall Metropolitan Borough Council

 
Politics of Walsall
Council elections in the West Midlands (county)
Metropolitan borough council elections in England